The Fengshan Tiangong Temple is a temple in Fengshan District, Kaohsiung, Taiwan. This temple is dedicated to Jade Emperor.

History
The temple was constructed in 1798.

Architecture
The temple is a two-story building designed in the Southern Chinese architectural style.

Transportation
The temple is accessible within walking distance southwest of Dadong Station of the Kaohsiung MRT.

See also
 Fengshan Longshan Temple
 Yuanching Temple, Changhua County
 List of temples in Taiwan
 List of tourist attractions in Taiwan

References

1798 establishments in Taiwan
Religious buildings and structures completed in 1798
Taoist temples in Taiwan
Temples in Kaohsiung